Silver Run is a stream in the U.S. state of West Virginia. It is a tributary of the North Fork Hughes River.

According to tradition, a silver object found during railroad construction accounts for the name.

See also
List of rivers of West Virginia

References

Rivers of Ritchie County, West Virginia
Rivers of West Virginia